Niranjan Singh Tasneem (May 2, 1929 - August 17, 2019) was a Punjabi novelist.

Books
Gawāce aratha	 
Parachāweṃ	 
Gwache arth	 
Reta chala	 
Adhunik parvirtian ate 
Ajanabī loka : nāwala	 
At the crossroads 
Ādhunika prawaratīāṃ ate Pañjābī nāwala	 
Āīne de rūbarū : sāhitaka sawaijīwanī	 
Glittering sands 
Studies in modern Punjabi literature 
Shadows 
Qadir Yar

Awards

Tasneem won the Sahitya Akademi Award in 1999 for his book Gawache Arth (Novel) and the Punjabi Sahit Rattan Award in 2015.

References 

Novelists from Punjab, India
Punjabi-language writers
Punjabi people
Recipients of the Sahitya Akademi Award in Punjabi
20th-century Indian novelists
1929 births
2019 deaths